The following is a list of Saturn Award winners for Best Retro Television Series on DVD.

Best Retro Television Series on DVD